is a Japanese manga series written and illustrated by Konomi Wagata. It began serialization in Shogakukan's Ciao magazine in 2015. It is licensed in English by Seven Seas Entertainment.

In 2020, it won the Shogakukan Manga Award for Children's manga.

Publication
Written and illustrated by Konomi Wagata, My New Life as a Cat began serialization in Shogakukan's Ciao magazine on October 3, 2015. It has been collected in ten volumes as of June 2023. The manga is licensed in English by Seven Seas Entertainment.

Reception
In 2020, the manga won the 65th Shogakukan Manga Award in the Children's manga category.

References

External links
 

Comics about cats
Romantic comedy anime and manga
Seven Seas Entertainment titles
Shogakukan manga
Shōjo manga
Slice of life anime and manga
Winners of the Shogakukan Manga Award for children's manga